Sølvmunn (Silvermouth) is a Norwegian drama and family film from 1981 directed by Per Blom. The main roles are played by Tobias Asphaug and Jon Skolmen.

Plot
The film tells the story of a nine-year-old boy named Fredrik that lives with his father after his mother has left. The father and son stick together through thick and thin, but problems arise when Fredrik's father meets Tove. Much of the film is seen from the child's perspective. The film depicts how Fredrik, nicknamed Sølvmunn 'Silvermouth', experiences his own world and the world of adults.

Reception
Sølvmunn received a mixed reception from Arbeiderbladet's reviewer Bjørn Granum when it was released. Among other things, he wrote that "We can look forward to another well-executed child portrayal in Norwegian film, after Løperjenten, Liten Ida, and Zeppelin." But he also wrote that "The first three-quarters of the film are pure nonsense, poorly written and played, and indifferently directed. The film does not take off until the conflict between the child and the adults escalates in earnest. Dagbladet's Thor Ellingsen was more positive in his review, and wrote, among other things, that "Sølvmunn is a professional and polished work—without being slick."

Cast

 Jon Skolmen as Fredrik's father 
 Tobias Asphaug as Fredrik 
 Kine Hellebust as Fredrik's mother 
 Sigrid Huun as Tove
 Turid Balke as the angry landlady
 Jan Olav Brynjulfsen as the watchman
 Lars Andreas Larssen as a man on the airplane
 Hallvard Lydvo as a man on the airplane 
 William Nyrén as a policeman
 Gard Øyen as a man on the airplane
 Nina Sonja Peterson as Fredrik's friend Minken  
 Leif Skarra as a man on the airplane
 Bjørn Sothberg as the parking attendant

References

External links 
 
 Sølvmunn at the National Library of Norway

1981 films
Norwegian drama films
1980s Norwegian-language films
1981 drama films